The Karthala scops owl (Otus pauliani), also known as the Grand Comoro scops owl or Comoro scops owl, is a small scops owl endemic to the island of Grande Comore in the Comoro Islands.

Taxonomy
The Karthala scops owl was formerly considered to be a subspecies of the Madagascar scops owl (Otus rutilus), but with the other Comoro Islands scops owls, it is now regarded as a separate species.

Description
The Karthala scops owl lacks ear-tufts and comes in two colour forms, a light morph and a dark morph. The light morph is dark greyish-brown on the upperparts with fine barring and pale spots along the scapulars. The underparts are reddish-buff with a dense pattern of fine barring on the flight feathers and tail. The dark morph is overall dark chocolate brown but no specimen of a dark morph individual has been taken.

Voice
Its call is a whistled "toot", which is given repeatedly with one second intervals.

Distribution and habitat
Endemic to the island of Grande Comore, the Karthala scops owl is found only on Mount Karthala, an active volcano. Here it inhabits the montane forest, some secondary growth and the tree-heath above the forest.

Behaviour
Nocturnal and very territorial, the Karthala scops owl will approach an imitation of its call, otherwise almost unknown. It has relatively weak talons so probably feeds on insects and other invertebrates. It is thought to nest in tree cavities.

Status and population
It has an estimated population of 2,000. It is classified as endangered due to it being restricted to such a small area, which is being rapidly deforested.

References

External links
BirdLife Species Factsheet

Karthala scops owl
Endemic birds of the Comoros
Grande Comore
Critically endangered fauna of Africa
Karthala scops owl
Taxa named by Constantine Walter Benson